The Itapagipe Peninsula is a peninsula located in the city of Salvador, capital of the Brazilian state of Bahia. The peninsula comprises Administrative Region III, including the neighborhoods of Alagados, Boa Viagem beach, Bonfim, Monte Serrat, Ribeira, Uruguai, Mares, Roma, Caminho de Areia, Vila Ruy Barbosa, and Massaranduba, among others. Rua Fernandes Viêira and Avenida Afrânio Peixoto roughly form a boundary between the peninsula and the city of Salvador. The Church of Our Lady of Penha, one of the earliest structures, occupies the northern tip of the peninsula.

Etymology 
The name "Itapagipe" comes from the Tupi language and means "place of the stone in the river" (ita, stone + paba, place + 'y, river + pe, in).

History

The peninsula was settled soon after the founding of Salvador in the mid-16th century. The historic center of Salvador, which sits a high bluff, was subject to frequent landslides throughout the colonial period. They caused widespread destruction, both the death of residents of the area and the destruction of public building. Marcos de Noronha, Viceroy of Brazil from 1806 to 1808, transferred the administration of Salvador to the peninsula, and called on the architects João Silva Muniz and José da Costa e Silva, both of Rio de Janeiro, to oversee the project. A navigable channel was planned at the isthmus the peninsula was planned, but the project was abandoned and the channel never built.

Neighborhoods

Alagados
Bonfim
Caminho de Areia
Mares
Massaranduba
Monte Serrat
Ribeira 
Roma
Uruguai
Vila Ruy Barbosa

Historic structures

The Itapagipe Peninsula, due to its early settlement by the Portuguese, is home to a designated historic district and numerous protected structures by federal, state, and municipal authorities. They range in construction from the 16th to 19th centuries.

Perimeter of the Penha Subdistrict (Perímetro do Subdistrito da Penha)
Church of Nosso Senhor do Bonfim
Church of Our Lady of Penha
Church and Hospice of Our Lady of the Good Journey (Igreja e Hospício de Nossa Senhora da Boa Viagem)
Largo da Madragoa, no. 08
Solar Amado Bahia
Antigo Hospital Português e Jardins
Church and Monastery of Our Lady of Monserrate (Igreja e Mosteiro de Nossa Senhora do Monte Serrat)
Fort of Monserrate (Forte do Monte Serrat)
Dom Pedro II Home
Fábrica Fratelli

References

Geography of Salvador, Bahia
Peninsulas of Brazil
Landforms of Bahia